Kenneth Falkenberg (born May 15, 1984) is a Danish football goalkeeper.

References

External links
 Profile at danskfodbold.com

1984 births
Living people
Danish men's footballers
Silkeborg IF players
Association football goalkeepers